Batangas's 3rd congressional district is one of the six congressional districts of the Philippines in the province of Batangas. It has been represented in the House of Representatives of the Philippines since 1916 and earlier in the Philippine Assembly from 1907 to 1916. The district consists of the northern Batangas cities of Santo Tomas and Tanauan, as well as adjacent municipalities surrounding the Taal Lake: Agoncillo, Alitagtag, Balete, Cuenca, Laurel, Malvar, Mataasnakahoy, San Nicolas, Santa Teresita and Talisay. It is currently represented in the 19th Congress by Ma. Theresa V. Collantes of the Nationalist People's Coalition (NPC).

Representation history

Election results

2022

2019

2016

≥u

2013

2010

2007

See also
Legislative districts of Batangas

References

Congressional districts of the Philippines
Politics of Batangas
1907 establishments in the Philippines
Congressional districts of Calabarzon
Constituencies established in 1907